Samuel John Moll (born January 3, 1992) is an American professional baseball pitcher for the Oakland Athletics of Major League Baseball (MLB). The Colorado Rockies selected Moll in the third round of the 2013 Major League Baseball draft. He made his MLB debut in 2017.

Career

Amateur
Moll attended St. Benedict at Auburndale High School in Cordova, Tennessee. He enrolled at the University of Memphis and played college baseball for the Memphis Tigers. In 2012, he played collegiate summer baseball with the Brewster Whitecaps of the Cape Cod Baseball League.

Colorado Rockies
The Colorado Rockies selected Moll in the third round of the 2013 Major League Baseball draft. He made his professional debut with the Low-A Tri-City Dust Devils, posting a 1.80 ERA in 30 innings pitched. In July, Moll combined with three other pitchers to throw a no-hitter. He returned to Tri-City in 2014 and appeared in only nine games due to injury. In 2015, he pitched for both the High-A Modesto Nuts and the Double-A New Britain Rock Cats, where he posted a combined 2.63 ERA with 74 strikeouts in 68.1 innings pitched between both clubs. After the season, he pitched in the Arizona Fall League. Moll spent 2016 with the Triple-A Albuquerque Isotopes, where he posted a 3–5 record with a 4.94 ERA. The Rockies added him to their 40-man roster after the season. Moll began the 2017 season with Albuquerque, but was designated for assignment on August 11, 2017.

Oakland Athletics
On August 16, 2017, Moll was traded to the Oakland Athletics in exchange for a player to be named later or cash considerations. Oakland optioned him to the Triple-A Nashville Sounds upon his acquisition.

The Athletics promoted Moll to the major leagues on September 1, 2017, and he made his major league debut that night. He was designated for assignment after the season on November 20.

Toronto Blue Jays
On November 27, 2017, Moll was claimed off waivers by the Pittsburgh Pirates. After being designated for assignment by Pittsburgh, the Seattle Mariners claimed Moll off waivers on November 30.

On March 17, 2018, Moll was claimed off waivers by the Toronto Blue Jays. He was designated for assignment on March 29, and was assigned outright to the Triple-A Buffalo Bisons after clearing waivers on March 31. In 15 games with Buffalo, Moll logged a 1-3 record and 5.30 ERA.

San Francisco Giants
In the 2018 Winter Meetings, the San Francisco Giants selected Moll from the Blue Jays in the minor league phase of the Rule 5 draft. He was assigned to the Double-A Richmond Flying Squirrels to start the 2019 season, and also pitched for the Triple-A Sacramento River Cats. Between the two teams in 2019, he was 2-2 with 2 saves and a 2.39 ERA in 41 relief appearances covering 49 innings in which he struck out 54 batters. He became a free agent following the 2019 season. He re-signed with the Giants on a minor league contract on January 6, 2020. Moll did not play in a game in 2020 due to the cancellation of the minor league season because of the COVID-19 pandemic. Moll became a free agent on November 2, 2020.

Arizona Diamondbacks
On November 17, 2020, Moll signed a minor league contract with the Arizona Diamondbacks organization. Moll was assigned to the Triple-A Reno Aces to begin the 2021 season. In 21 appearances with Reno, Moll recorded a 5.82 ERA with 30 strikeouts in 21.2 innings of work.

Oakland Athletics (second stint)
On July 2, 2021, Moll was traded to the Oakland Athletics organization in exchange for cash considerations. The following day, Moll was selected to the active roster. On July 17, Moll made his first appearance with Oakland in 2021, and first MLB appearance since 2017, pitching a scoreless inning against the Cleveland Indians.

See also
Rule 5 draft results

References

External links

1992 births
Living people
People from Shelby County, Tennessee
Baseball players from Tennessee
Major League Baseball pitchers
Oakland Athletics players
Memphis Tigers baseball players
Brewster Whitecaps players
Tri-City Dust Devils players
Modesto Nuts players
New Britain Rock Cats players
Salt River Rafters players
Albuquerque Isotopes players
Grand Junction Rockies players
Nashville Sounds players
Buffalo Bisons (minor league) players
Richmond Flying Squirrels players
Sacramento River Cats players
Reno Aces players